Blagoveshchensky District is an administrative and municipal district (raion), one of the fifty-four in the Republic of Bashkortostan, Russia. It is located in the northern central part of the republic and borders with Karaidelsky District in the north, Nurimanovsky District in the east, Ufimsky District in the south, Kushnarenkovsky District in the southwest, Birsky District in the west, and with Mishkinsky District in the northwest. Its administrative center is the town of Blagoveshchensk (which is not administratively a part of the district). As of the 2010 Census, the total population of the district was 15,497.

Administrative and municipal status
Within the framework of administrative divisions, Blagoveshchensky District is one of the fifty-four in the Republic of Bashkortostan. It is divided into fifteen selsoviets, comprising ninety-nine rural localities. The town of Blagoveshchensk serves as its administrative center, despite being incorporated separately as a town of republic significance—an administrative unit with the status equal to that of the districts.

As a municipal division, the district is incorporated as Blagoveshchensky Municipal District, with the town of republic significance of Blagoveshchensk being incorporated within it as Blagoveshchensk Urban Settlement. Its fifteen selsoviets are incorporated as fifteen rural settlements within the municipal district. The town of BLagoveshchensk serves as the administrative center of the municipal district as well.

References

Notes

Sources

Districts of Bashkortostan
 
